Joseph Tarchaneiotes was a Byzantine general primarily known for his lack of participation in the decisive Battle of Manzikert (1071).

Biography
An experienced general, Joseph was second-in-command of the Byzantine operation at Manzikert, with some 30,000–40,000 soldiers under his command. Tarchaneiotes's segment of the army was detached to take nearby Khliat before the main battle took place. It is not clear what happened then, though in any case Khliat was not taken by the Byzantines. Tarchaneiotes's lack of participation in the campaign, whether due to treachery, dissatisfaction, or a defeat in battle, seriously undermined Romanos IV's (r. 1068 – 1071) ability to fight at Manzikert. Even though his detachment was either defeated (according to Seljuk sources) or eliminated by causes unknown (Byzantine sources do not mention it at all), Tarchaneiotes survived.

Joseph died in 1074, whilst serving as the doux of Antioch, and was succeeded by his son Katakalon Tarchaneiotes.

References

Sources

11th-century births
1074 deaths
Byzantine generals
Joseph
Byzantine governors of Antioch